Charles Dunlap was a Republican member of the Wisconsin State Assembly during the 1875 session. Dunlap was a resident of Elkhorn, Wisconsin.

References

External links
The Political Graveyard

People from Elkhorn, Wisconsin
Republican Party members of the Wisconsin State Assembly
Year of birth missing
Year of death missing